The Masson Range is a high broken chain of mountains, consisting primarily of the North Masson, Central Masson and South Masson Ranges and the Trilling Peaks, forming a part of the Framnes Mountains. It was discovered and charted by the British Australian and New Zealand Antarctic Research Expedition, 1929–31, under Douglas Mawson, and named for Professor Sir David Orme Masson, a member of the Advisory Committee for this expedition as well as the Australasian Antarctic Expedition, 1911–14, also under Mawson. The mountains were first visited by an Australian National Antarctic Research Expeditions party led by John Béchervaise in 1956.

Further reading 
 Damien Gildea, Mountaineering in Antarctica: complete guide: Travel guide
 B. A. Marmo, J. Dawson, Movement and structural features observed in ice masses, Framnes Mountains, Mac.Robertson Land, East Antarctica, Annals of Glaciology, Volume 23 1996, pp. 388–395, Cambridge University Press, 20 January 2017, DOI: https://doi.org/10.3189/S0260305500013689
 Mackintosh, Andrew & White, Duanne & Fink, David & Gore, Damian & Pickard, John & Fanning, Patricia. (2007), Exposure ages from mountain dipsticks in Mac. Robertson Land, East Antarctica, indicate little change in ice-sheet thickness since the Last Glacial Maximum, Geology. 35. https://doi.org/10.1130/G23503A.1.

External links 

 Masson Range on USGS website
 Masson Range on AADC website
 Masson Range on SCAR website
 Masson Range area satellite image
 Masson Range's images

References

Mountain ranges of Mac. Robertson Land